Diana Isabel Pineda Zuleta (born September 6, 1984) is a female diver from Colombia, who competed in two Summer Olympics for her native country, starting in 2000. She claimed three medals at the 2008 South American Swimming Championships in São Paulo.

References
 

1984 births
Living people
Colombian female divers
Olympic divers of Colombia
Divers at the 2000 Summer Olympics
Divers at the 2008 Summer Olympics
Divers at the 2016 Summer Olympics
Pan American Games competitors for Colombia
Divers at the 2003 Pan American Games
Divers at the 2007 Pan American Games
Divers at the 2011 Pan American Games
Divers at the 2015 Pan American Games
South American Games silver medalists for Colombia
South American Games medalists in diving
Competitors at the 2014 South American Games
Competitors at the 2022 South American Games
Divers at the 2019 Pan American Games
Sportspeople from Medellín
21st-century Colombian women